The Asia/Oceania Zone is one of the three zones of regional Davis Cup competition in 2012.

In the Asia/Oceania Zone there are four different groups in which teams compete against each other to advance to the next group.

Teams

Group A
 
  (promoted to group III)

Group B
  (promoted to group III)

Format
The ten teams will be split into two pools of five, the top nation from each pool will play against the runner-up from the other pool. The two winners will be promoted.

It will played on the week commencing 16 April 2012 at Doha, Qatar and it will be played on outdoor hard court.

Groups

Group A

Bahrain vs. Turkmenistan

Saudi Arabia vs. Iraq

Iraq vs. Turkmenistan

United Arab Emirates vs. Saudi Arabia

Saudi Arabia vs. Turkmenistan

United Arab Emirates vs. Bahrain

United Arab Emirates vs. Iraq

Bahrain vs. Saudi Arabia

United Arab Emirates vs. Turkmenistan

Bahrain vs. Iraq

Group B

Singapore vs. Cambodia

Qatar vs. Myanmar

Jordan vs. Myanmar

Qatar vs. Cambodia

Jordan vs. Singapore

Myanmar vs. Cambodia

Qatar vs. Jordan

Singapore vs. Myanmar

Jordan vs. Cambodia

Qatar vs. Singapore

Play-offs

1st to 4th play-off

Qatar vs. United Arab Emirates

Turkmenistan vs. Cambodia

5th to 6th play-off

Saudi Arabia vs. Singapore

7th to 8th play-off

Iraq vs. Jordan

9th to 10th play-off

Bahrain vs. Myanmar

References

External links
Official Website

Asia Oceania Zone IV
Davis Cup Asia/Oceania Zone